Theophilos (sometimes Latinized or Anglicized as Theophilus or Theophilo; c. 812 20 January 842) was the Byzantine Emperor from 829 until his death in 842. He was the second emperor of the Amorian dynasty and the last emperor to support iconoclasm. Theophilos personally led the armies in his long war against the Arabs, beginning in 831.

Life

Early

Theophilos was the son of the Byzantine Phrygian Greek Emperor Michael II and his wife Thekla, and the godson of Emperor Leo V the Armenian. Michael II crowned Theophilos co-emperor in 821. The date is almost universally given as 12 May 821 (Whitsunday), although this is not really corroborated by any source (another possible date is 24 March, Easter). Unlike his father, Theophilos received an extensive education from John Hylilas, the grammarian, and was a great admirer of music and art. On 2 October 829, Theophilos succeeded his father as sole emperor.

Theophilos continued in his predecessors' iconoclasm, though without his father's more conciliatory tone, issuing an edict in 832 forbidding the veneration of icons. He also saw himself as the champion of justice, which he served most ostentatiously by executing his father's co-conspirators against Leo V immediately after his accession.

War against the Arabs

At the time of his accession, Theophilos was obliged to wage wars against the Arabs on two fronts.  Sicily was once again invaded by the Arabs, who took Palermo after a year-long siege in 831, established the Emirate of Sicily, and gradually continued to expand across the island. The defence after the invasion of Anatolia by Al-Ma'mun the Abbasid Caliph in 830 was led by the Emperor himself, but the Byzantines were defeated and lost several fortresses. In 831 Theophilos retaliated by leading a large army into Cilicia and capturing Tarsus. The Emperor returned to Constantinople in triumph, but in the autumn he was defeated in Cappadocia. Another defeat in the same province in 833 forced Theophilos to sue for peace (Theophilos offered 100,000 gold dinars and the return of 7,000 prisoners), which he obtained the next year, after the death of Al-Ma'mun.

During the respite from the war against the Abbasids, Theophilos arranged for the abduction of the Byzantine captives settled north of the Danube by Krum of Bulgaria. The rescue operation was carried out with success in c. 836, and the peace between Bulgaria and the Byzantine Empire was quickly restored. However, it proved impossible to maintain peace in the East. Theophilos had given asylum to a number of refugees from the east in 834, including Nasr, a Persian. He baptized one of the refugees, Theophobos, who married the Emperor's aunt Irene and became one of his generals. As relations with the Abbasids deteriorated, Theophilos prepared for a new war.

In 837 Theophilos led a vast army of 70,000 men towards Mesopotamia and captured Melitene and Arsamosata.  The Emperor also took and destroyed Zapetra (Zibatra, Sozopetra), which some sources claim as the birthplace of Caliph al-Mu'tasim. Theophilos returned to Constantinople in triumph. Eager for revenge, Al-Mu'tasim assembled a vast army and launched a two-pronged invasion of Anatolia in 838. Theophilos decided to strike one division of the caliph's army before they could combine. On 21 July 838 at the Battle of Anzen in Dazimon, Theophilos personally led a Byzantine army of 25,000 to 40,000 men against the troops commanded by al-Afshin. Afshin withstood the Byzantine attack, counter-attacked, and won the battle. The Byzantine survivors fell back in disorder and did not interfere in the caliph's continuing campaign.

Al-Mu'tasim took Ancyra, and al-Afshin joined him there. The full Abbasid army advanced against Amorium, the cradle of the dynasty. Initially there was determined resistance. Then a Muslim captive escaped and informed the caliph where there was a section of the wall that had only a front facade. Al-Mu'tasim concentrated his bombardment on this section, and the wall was breached. Having heroically held for fifty-five days, the city fell to al-Mu'tasim on 12 or 15 August 838.

In 838, in order to impress the Caliph of Baghdad, Theophilus had John the Grammarian distribute 36,000 nomismata to the citizens of Baghdad. In 839 or 840, he initiated diplomatic contact with the Umayyad Emirate of Córdoba. The name of his ambassador is somewhat garbled in the Arabic accounts of Ibn Hayyan, but it seems to have been the admiral Karteros. He was accompanied on his return by the Córdoban poet al-Ghazal, who signed a pact of friendship with Theophilos directed against the Abbasids.

Around 841, the Republic of Venice sent a fleet of 60 galleys (each carrying 200 men) to assist the Byzantines in driving the Arabs from Crotone, but it failed. During this campaign Al-Mu'tasim discovered that some of his top generals were plotting against him.  Many of these leading commanders were arrested and some executed before he arrived home. Al-Afshin seems not to have been involved in this, but he was detected in other intrigues and died in prison in the spring of 841. Caliph al-Mu'tasim fell sick in October 841 and died on 5 January 842.

It is said that Theophilos, even though fighting the Arabs built a Baghdad-style palace near the Bosporus. In those days people went about a l'arabe  in kaftans and turbans. Even as far as in the normal  streets of Ghuangzhou during the era of Tang, the Arab-style kaftan was in fashion.

Relations with Bulgaria and Serbia

In 836, following the expiration of the 20-year peace treaty between the Empire and Bulgaria, Theophilos ravaged the Bulgarian frontier. The Bulgarians retaliated, and under the leadership of Isbul they reached Adrianople. At this time, if not earlier, the Bulgarians annexed Philippopolis (Plovdiv) and its environs.  Khan Malamir died in 836.

The peace between the Serbs, Byzantine foederati, and the Bulgars lasted until 839. Vlastimir of Serbia united several tribes, and Theophilos granted the Serbs independence; Vlastimir acknowledged nominal overlordship of the Emperor. The annexation of western Macedonia by the Bulgars changed the political situation. Malamir or his successor may have seen a threat in the Serb consolidation and opted to subjugate them in the midst of the conquest of Slav lands. Another cause might have been that the Byzantines wanted to divert attention so that they could cope with the Slavic uprising in the Peloponnese, meaning they sent the Serbs to instigate the war. It is thought that the rapid extension of Bulgars over Slavs prompted the Serbs to unite into a state.

Khan Presian I (r. 836–852) invaded Serbian territory in 839 (see Bulgarian–Serbian Wars). The invasion led to a three-year war, in which Vlastimir was victorious; Presian was heavily defeated, made no territorial gains, and lost many of his men. The Serbs had a tactical advantage in the hills, and the Bulgars were driven out by the army of Vlastimir. The war ended with the death of Theophilos, which released Vlastimir from his obligations to the Byzantine Empire.

Death and legacy
The health of Theophilos gradually failed, and he died on 20 January 842. His reputation as a judge endured, and in the literary composition Timarion Theophilos is featured as one of the judges in the Netherworld. Theophilos strengthened the Walls of Constantinople, built the fortress of Sarkel on the Don river in Khazar territories, created the Cherson, Paphlagonia and Chaldia themes, and built a hospital, which continued to exist until the twilight of the Byzantine Empire.

Family

By his marriage with Theodora, Theophilos had seven children:
 Constantine, co-emperor from c. 833 to c. 835.
 Thekla (c. 831after 867). She was named Augusta and her image appears in coinage during the regency of her mother. Later exiled to a monastery by her brother Michael.
 Anna (born c. 832). Exiled into the monastery of Gastria. Never recalled.
 Anastasia (born c. 833). Exiled into the monastery of Gastria. Never recalled.
 Pulcheria (born c. 836). Exiled into the monastery of Gastria. Never recalled.
 Maria (c. 838c. 842). Betrothed the Caesar Alexios Mosele. Died at the age of four.
 Michael III (19 January 84024 September 867), who succeeded as emperor.

See also

List of Byzantine emperors

Notes

References

 John Bagot Glubb The Empire of the Arabs, Hodder and Stoughton, London, 1963

External links

9th-century Byzantine emperors
Phrygian dynasty
Byzantine people of the Arab–Byzantine wars
9th-century births
842 deaths
Byzantine Iconoclasm
820s in the Byzantine Empire
830s in the Byzantine Empire
840s in the Byzantine Empire
Sons of Byzantine emperors